Geresdlak is a village in Baranya county, Hungary.

Population 
In 2011, 31.7% of the population declared themselves to be German-speaking Hungarians. Between 2000 and 2013, about 150 Finnish citizens moved to the village. They represent 19.61% of the local population of Geresdlak. The population in 2013 was 765.

Sister towns 
  Uskali, Finland
  Kiihtelysvaara, Finland
  Raatevaara, Finland
  Grambach, Austria
  Zebegény, Hungary

External links 
 Street map 

Populated places in Baranya County